Salgótarján is city with county rights in Hungary, the capital of Nógrád county, north-eastern Hungary, making it the third smallest county capital based on population. The nearby Salgó castle is a well-known tourist attraction.

Location
Salgótarján is surrounded by beautiful forests and hills topped with castle ruins, which are accessible by bus that may be taken from the center of town.

History

The town already existed in the Middle Ages, but information on it is scarce possibly because it was a small settlement. The word salgó means "shining" in Old Hungarian, while Tarján was the name of one of the Hungarian tribes conquering the area.

The castle of Salgó was built in the 13th century on a mountain of volcanic origin. In the 13th century the town already had a church.

After the 1682 siege of the nearby Castle of Fülek (today Fiľakovo, Slovakia) the town was deserted, and new settlers arrived only ten years later, but remained a small village.

Development came in the mid-19th century, when a coal mine was opened nearby. The job opportunities provided by the mine and the developing industry began to attract people. The village grew quickly and was granted town status in 1922.  Today visitors can see the remains of the mining industry by visiting the Mine Museum, which is located next to the main entrance of the mine.

In 1950, Salgótarján became the capital of Nógrád county instead of the previous county seat Balassagyarmat, although the county offices did not move there until 1952. In the next twenty years several villages were annexed to the growing city.

The coal mines closed years ago, leaving the city with high unemployment rates.

In 1994, Salgótarján was granted the rank of city with county rights, in accord with a new law stating that all county seats are cities with county rights. (Previously only cities with a population over 50.000 were granted county rights, and Salgótarján was one of only two county seats that had smaller population than 50.000; the other was Szekszárd).

Places of interest
The town is near two ruined castles and contains two museums, among other places of interest.
 Plébániatemplom (Cathedral), located opposite the County History Museum, is the main church in the town.
 Nógrádi Történeti Múzeum (county of Nógrád History Museum) is the town's principal museum with exhibits about the history of the county.  There is a special exhibit on János Balázs, the Romany poet and painter who lived in the city.
 Nógrádi Történeti Múzeum Bányászati Kiállítóhelye (Mining Museum), is the main mining museum in the country, with exhibits about the history of mining in the region.  Visitors can view a section of the mine and see mining equipment.
 Somoskő (Šomoška) Castle in the suburb of Somoskő is the better preserved of the two castles.  It is situated atop a 526 meter tall hill. One of the three original towers is restored. The castle lies on the Slovak side of the border, but it's easily accessible from the Hungarian village of Somoskő.
 Salgó Castle Ruins, in the suburb of Salgóbánya, is 625 meters above sea level, giving it a panoramic view of the area.

Sport
The city has an association football club. Salgótarjáni BTC competed in the Nemzeti Bajnokság III.

Twin towns – sister cities

Salgótarján is twinned with:

 Banská Bystrica, Slovakia
 Gliwice, Poland
 Kemerovo, Russia
 Lučenec, Slovakia
 Uricani, Romania
 Vantaa, Finland
 Vigarano Mainarda, Italy

References

External links

Official website in Hungarian and English

County seats in Hungary
Cities with county rights of Hungary
Populated places in Nógrád County
Socialist planned cities
Planned cities in Hungary